The Caren Range is a low and mostly tree-covered mountain range in the Pacific Ranges of the Coast Mountains in southwestern British Columbia, Canada.  It lies along the eastern shore of the Sechelt Peninsula, southeast of Sakinaw Lake, about 74 km northwest of Vancouver.  It has an area of 169 km2 and contains Spipiyus Provincial Park. The name of the range is a long-standing misinterpretation of Carew. It was named for Benjamin Hallowell Carew. The range is noted for its ancient trees.

References

Pacific Ranges
Sunshine Coast (British Columbia)